The Poncione dei Laghetti is a mountain of the Swiss Lepontine Alps, located east of Lavertezzo in the canton of Ticino. It lies on the range between the valleys of Verzasca and Leventina.

References

External links
 Poncione dei Laghetti on Hikr

Mountains of the Alps
Mountains of Switzerland
Mountains of Ticino
Lepontine Alps